Benoit-Philibert Perroud (1796 Lyon -1887, Lyon),  was a French entomologist.

Benoit-Philibert Perroud was a specialist in Coleoptera. He was a Member of  the Société entomologique de France, the Société Linnéenne de Lyon and the Entomological Society of Stettin.

Works
partial list
Perroud, B. P. 1855. Description de quelques espèces nouvelles ou peu connus et création de quelques nouveaux genres dans la famille des longicornes. Annales de la Societé Linneene de Lyon (2)2:327-401.
Perroud, B.-P. and Montrousier, P [Reverendus Pater]. 1864: Essai sur la faune entomologique de Kanala (Nouvelle Calédonie) et descriptions de quelques espèces nouvelles ou peu connues. Annales de la Société Linnéenne de Lyon, 11: 46-257.

External links
CTHS

French entomologists
Coleopterists
Scientists from Lyon
1796 births
1887 deaths